Richard Harrison Truly (born November 12, 1937) is a retired vice admiral in the United States Navy, a former fighter pilot, engineer, astronaut, and was the eighth administrator of the National Aeronautics and Space Administration (NASA) from 1989 to 1992. He was the first former astronaut to head the space agency.

After his departure from NASA, he led the Georgia Tech Research Institute from 1992 to 1997, and the National Renewable Energy Laboratory from 1997 to 2005.

Early life and education
Born November 12, 1937, in Fayette, Mississippi, Truly attended segregated schools in Fayette and Meridian, Mississippi. He received a Bachelor of Science degree in aeronautical engineering from Georgia Institute of Technology in 1959. He was a member of the Kappa Alpha Order. He was active in the Boy Scouts of America, achieving its highest rank of Eagle Scout.

Being a member of the Navy ROTC at Georgia Tech, Truly entered the U.S. Navy, where he was ordered to flight school and was designated a naval aviator on October 7, 1960. His initial tour of duty was in Fighter Squadron 33 (VF-33) where he flew F-8 Crusaders aboard USS Intrepid and USS Enterprise. He made more than 300 carrier landings.

From 1963 to 1965, Truly was first a student and later an instructor at the U.S. Air Force Aerospace Research Pilot School at Edwards Air Force Base, California.

NASA career
In 1965, Truly was among the first military astronauts selected to the United States Air Force's Manned Orbiting Laboratory (MOL) program in Los Angeles, California. He joined NASA Astronaut Group 7 in August 1969 after the cancellation of the MOL program. At NASA, he was a member of the astronaut support crew and capsule communicator (CAPCOM) for all three of the crewed Skylab missions in 1973, and the Apollo–Soyuz mission in 1975. He flew three times on one of the two-man crews for the 1977 Approach and Landing Tests of the Space Shuttle Enterprise, and on the STS-2 mission in 1981, becoming the first man to be launched into space on his birthday. Truly then served as commander of STS-8 in 1983.

After STS-8, Truly left NASA to become the first commander of the Naval Space Command.

Return to flight
Three weeks after the Space Shuttle Challenger disaster, Truly returned to NASA to become NASA's Associate Administrator for Space Flight on February 20, 1986. His primary task was to watch over the Space Shuttle's return to flight status. Along with that, he was also responsible for such long term issues as whether or not Challenger would be replaced, the role the Shuttle would play in the future and the mixture of expendable spacecraft and the shuttle for upcoming missions. While it only took a few days to determine the technical reason for the accident, sorting out the root cause was more difficult. In the end, it took Truly and NASA's "Return to Flight" program 31 months before the Space Shuttle Discovery successfully flew on September 29, 1988 with STS-26. In March 1986, Truly noted in a memo that there were several actions NASA needed to accomplish before launching another Shuttle flight. They included "Solid Rocket Motor joint redesign, Critical Items review, and Operations and Maintenance Instructions review".

NASA Administrator
Truly retired from the Navy as a vice admiral shortly before becoming NASA administrator. He was named to head NASA as its eighth administrator in May 1989, the first astronaut to do so. He held this position until May 1992. He was credited by Carl Sagan with interceding in an internal dispute regarding whether Voyager 1 should be commanded to take one last photograph of Earth before completing its primary mission. The resulting photograph has since become known as the Pale Blue Dot photograph.

On 12 February 1992, Truly was fired as Administrator. Two weeks before, Vice President Dan Quayle had met with Truly, requesting the Administrator step down and accept an ambassadorship. Truly considered the offer but ultimately declined.

When he was fired, Truly said, "I'm floored. I can't explain it". Senator Al Gore, who would succeed Quayle as vice president a year later, said he was concerned about the move, stating that Truly was "a good man who did a good job under difficult circumstances" and that "I view this as a very troubling sign that ... Quayle's space council may have forced Admiral Truly to leave this job because of the council's insistence on running NASA from the vice president's office."

Observers suggested the firing was due to Truly's focus on large-scale projects like extending the life of the Space Shuttle rather than smaller, faster missions favored by the administration. It was suggested "that he was captive of his bureaucracy and incapable of making the changes, the reforms, the administration wanted." Others pointed to the battle over the International Space Station, which unexpectedly ran into serious problems in Congress, requiring the administration to intervene to save it.

Post-NASA activities
After leaving NASA, Truly became Vice President and Director of the Georgia Tech Research Institute, part of the Georgia Institute of Technology, in Atlanta, Georgia. He served in this role from 1992 to 1997.

Then he served as director of the Department of Energy's National Renewable Energy Laboratory and as executive vice president of the MRIGlobal (formerly Midwest Research Institute) from 1997–2005.

In May 2007, Retired Vice Admiral Richard Truly testified before the U.S. Senate Committee on Foreign Relations as a member of a military advisory board on the subject of the threats to U.S. national security posed by global climate change.

In 2010, Truly was appointed to the board of trustees of the Colorado School of Mines by Governor Bill Ritter. He is currently the vice chairman of the board.

Truly is married and has three children.

Popular culture
In 2022, he is portrayed by John Hartmann in the third season of the alternate history web television series For All Mankind.

Decorations

Truly was awarded the following military decorations and government awards:

In 1988, he was awarded the Society of Experimental Test Pilots James H. Doolittle Award. He also received that year the Collier Trophy for his role in assisting NASA's return to launching crewed missions after the Challenger disaster. He was awarded the Johnson Space Center Superior Achievement Award in 1972. He also received the American Astronautical Society's Flight Achievement Award in 1977. In 1995 he was inducted into the Georgia Aviation Hall of Fame. He was awarded the General Thomas D. White USAF Space Trophy for 1981.

See also
 List of Eagle Scouts

References

External links

1937 births
Living people
American test pilots
Administrators of NASA
United States Navy astronauts
United States Astronaut Hall of Fame inductees
People from Fayette, Mississippi
Georgia Tech alumni
U.S. Air Force Test Pilot School alumni
United States Navy vice admirals
United States Naval Aviators
Georgia Tech Research Institute people
Recipients of the Legion of Merit
Recipients of the Distinguished Flying Cross (United States)
Recipients of the Defense Superior Service Medal
Recipients of the NASA Distinguished Service Medal
Recipients of the NASA Exceptional Service Medal
Collier Trophy recipients
American astronaut-politicians
Presidential Citizens Medal recipients
Members of the United States National Academy of Engineering
Recipients of the Defense Distinguished Service Medal
Space Shuttle program astronauts
George H. W. Bush administration personnel